The Sefwi Wiawso Senior High School is co-ed second cycle educational institution in Sefwi Wiaso in the Western North Region of Ghana.

The school was established in 1961 by Kwame Nkrumah. Its Sefwi language motto is 'Mate Masie', and means 'I hear and I keep'.

Notable alumni
Otumfuo Nana Osei Tutu II
Herod Cobbina

References

Educational institutions in Africa
Schools in Ghana
Western North Region
Educational institutions established in 1961
1961 establishments in Ghana